ILR-33 AMBER – Polish multistage suborbital rocket designed by Warsaw Institute of Aviation – Łukasiewicz Research Network. The main goal of development of AMBER is gaining experience in building rocket engines and rockets themselves. AMBER can be used in sounding the atmosphere, performing various experiments in microgravity and as a rocket and space technologies testing platform.

Description 
The rocket is 5 meters tall and has the diameter of 230 mm. It consists of two solid boosters and hybrid main engine. The main engine is a Polish construction which uses highly concentrated H2O2 as oxidiser. AMBER has reusable head. The recovery of payload is done by pyrotechnical separation from head and deploying drogue and main parachutes. Payload touches the ground with speed of about 8 m/s.

ILR-33 AMBER is designed to reach the Kármán line with 10 kilograms of payload. AMBER is a flagship project of Warsaw Institute of Aviation – Łukasiewicz Research Network.

History 
The rocket is in development since 2014. The oxidising agent of main engine is highly concentrated H2O2. as researchers from Institute have patented unique method on obtaining this compound by distillation. The project was repeatedly awarded: the jury of International Invention and Innovation Show INTARG 2018 gave the platinum medal in category "Industry" and Ministry of Investment and Economic Development diploma. On Moscow International Salon of Inventions and Innovation Technologies 2019 Łukasiewicz Research Network – Institute of Aviation has received silver medal for solution: „ILR-33 AMBER rocket as system of inventions and innovative platform to conduct experiments in micro-g environment”.

Because of the need to adjust regulations to perform flights od AMBER and similar rockets, the boundaries of air space of CPSP Ustka were extended.

Since 2019 a new version with higher performance is under development. New version is designated as the ILR-33 BURSZTYN 2K – which refers to Meteor 2K rocket. AMBER 2K will be equipped with enlarged boosters. Mass optimization of subsystems is also taking place. Service module is being prepared to host payloads – atmospheric sounding equipment or experiments using a micro-g environment

Missions 
The first test flight took place in 2017 on Drawsko Military Training Ground, during which there were basic assumptions, mechanisms and infrastructure of rocket verified in-flight. The maximum altitude of flight was limited due to restrictions of area where AMBER was tested. Another flight, planned on the end of 2018 was cancelled due to intense jet streams.

The second successful test was in may 2019 in Drawsko Pomorskie. There was modified rocket and new systems tested, i.a. steering module. On 10 September 2019 there was another flight performed to test steering system and the recovery of payload from the surface of the Baltic Sea

See also 
 Meteor – series of Polish sounding rockets, built between 1963 and 1974.

References 

Suborbital spaceflight
Rockets and missiles
Aviation in Poland